Muzzy Lane Software is a technology company developing game-based learning software tools in the Education Technology space.  In 2015 they released Muzzy Lane Author, a suite of tools that allow educators to create their own game-based learning assessments.

The company began by creating detailed strategy games with the goal of learning and teaching history. Their Making History series has been used in hundreds of classrooms; which led the company to create several commercial releases in the World War II and World War I eras.   They have worked with partners including McGraw-Hill Education, Pearson Education, Cengage Learning, the National Geographic Society, the Corporation for Public Broadcasting and directly with universities. Muzzy Lane published a research study on non-traditional students funded by the Bill & Melinda Gates Foundation in 2016.

In 2016, the company sold the Making History franchise to Factus Games, and is now focused entirely on educational technology.

History

Muzzy Lane Software was founded in 2002

In January 2011, Muzzy Lane moved their offices to the Towle Building in Newburyport due to the need for increased space for their growing team.  
in 2015, the company brought in a new CEO, Conall Ryan, a veteran in the Education and Publishing industries.  
In 2016, the company moved to Boston North Technology Park in Amesbury, MA

Games

References

External links
 Muzzy Lane's Official Website
 Past/Present website
 McGraw-Hill Practice line of Higher Education Games

Privately held companies based in Massachusetts
Video game companies of the United States
Video game development companies